Allai District is a district in the Hazara Division of Khyber Pakhtunkhwa province, Pakistan. 

It consists of eight union councils including Banna, Batila, Batkul, Biari, Jumbera, Pashto, Rushing and Shakargah. Alai was previously a tehsil within the Battagram District of the Hazara division.

References

Allai District
Districts of Khyber Pakhtunkhwa